Pseudabryna luzonica is a species of beetle in the family Cerambycidae. It was described by Arnold Schultze in 1916.

References

Pteropliini
Beetles described in 1916